The franc was the currency of the Swiss canton of Geneva between 1839 and 1850. It was subdivided into 100 centimes.

History
The franc replaced the thaler in 1839. It was equal to the French franc. In 1850, the Swiss franc was introduced, with 1 Swiss franc = 1 Geneva franc.

Coins

Billon coins were issued in denominations of 1, 2, 4, 5, 10 and 25 centimes. Small numbers of coins were struck in silver for 5 and 10 francs and in gold for 10 and 20 francs.

References

External links

Modern obsolete currencies
Currencies of Switzerland
1839 establishments in Switzerland
1850 disestablishments
19th century in Switzerland
19th-century economic history
Canton of Geneva
19th century in Geneva